Mary Louise Coulouris (17 July 1939 – 20 December 2011) was an American-British artist.

Early life and education
Mary Louise Coulouris was born in 1939 in New York City, the daughter of actor George Coulouris, and sister of computer scientist George F. Coulouris. She spent her first ten years in the United States, mainly in Beverly Hills.

She attended the Parliament Hill School, Chelsea School of Art, and the Slade School of Fine Art. She studied under William Coldstream and Anthony Gross at the Slade, and spent two years in Paris at the Ecole des Beaux Arts and Atelier 17, as a student of Stanley William Hayter. Her first solo exhibition was in Paris in 1964.

Career
Coulouris established a home and studio in Strawberry Bank, Linlithgow, West Lothian in 1976. Commissions included murals at the Linlithgow railway station (1985) and the Royal Edinburgh Hospital (1990); a series of watercolors for the House of Lords (2004), and a set of watercolors inspired by poetry for the Royal Free Hospital (2008); rug design for the Scottish Poetry Library (1999) and tapestries for Yale College, Wrexham (2002).

Coulouris was a fellow of the Royal Society of Painter-Printmakers. As a member of the League of Socialist Artists, she participated in "United We Stand", a 1974 London exhibition about mining, which featured works by coal miners and professional artists.

In addition to painting, printmaking, and design, Coulouris wrote two short plays with her son, Duncan Wallace.

Personal life
Mary Louise Coulouris married Scottish engineer Gordon Wallace in 1971; they had two children. The couple had a second home in Hydra, Greece, where Coulouris painted seaside scenes.

Death
Mary Louise Coulouris died in 2011 in Edinburgh, Scotland, aged 72, from motor neurone disease. A biography written by her husband was published in 2015.

References

External links
Archive of the artist's website as at December 2011, on the Coulouris family website coulouris.net; accessed 16 April 2017.

1939 births
2011 deaths
20th-century American women artists
21st-century American women artists
20th-century British women artists
Alumni of Chelsea College of Arts
Alumni of the Slade School of Fine Art
American people of English descent
American people of Greek descent
English artists
English people of Greek descent
English socialists
Deaths from motor neuron disease
Neurological disease deaths in Scotland
People from Linlithgow
American emigrants to England
American emigrants to Scotland
Artists from London
Artists from New York City